Warthill railway station was a station on the York to Beverley Line. It opened as Stockton station in 1847–8, was renamed to  Stockton Forest (later Stockton-on-the-Forest) in 1867; in 1872 it became Warthill station. The station closed in 1959.

History
Stockton station opened on 4 October 1847 and served the villages of Stockton-on-the-Forest and Warthill in North Yorkshire, England.

In 1867 it was renamed, Stockton Forest, and renamed again Stockton-on-Forest soon after. On 1 February 1872 it was renamed  Warthill station.

Between 1922 and 1932 the station was also the southern terminus of the Sand Hutton Light Railway. This railway supplied the estate of Sir Robert Walker.

The  level crossing at Warthill station was the first in the UK to have its manually operated gates replaced by lifting boom barriers.

It closed on 5 January 1959.

References

Sources

 
 

Disused railway stations in North Yorkshire
Railway stations in Great Britain opened in 1847
Railway stations in Great Britain closed in 1959
Former York and North Midland Railway stations
1847 establishments in England
George Townsend Andrews railway stations